Chris Bruno is an American film and television actor, director, and producer best known for his role as Sheriff Walt Bannerman on the USA Network television series The Dead Zone.

Early life
Bruno was born in New Haven, Connecticut, to actor Scott Bruno and the late Nancy M. Bruno. His younger brother, Dylan, is also an actor (best known for his role as Colby Granger in Numb3rs). The brothers grew up in Milford with their mother, Nancy, but spent a substantial amount of time with their father on Manhattan's Upper West Side. During college, Bruno was active in both theater and sports. After an injury sidelined his skiing career while attending college in Vermont, he auditioned for and was cast in the lead in The Mandrake.. Transferring to the State University of New York at Stony Brook as a theatre major, he became the starting pitcher for the school's baseball team.

Career

Soon after graduating college, Bruno joined the cast of Another World as Dennis Carrington Wheeler and was nominated for a Soap Opera Award for Outstanding Newcomer. After Another World, he was cast as Michael Delaney on ABC's All My Children. Bruno spent some time as a stand up comedian in the years following his soap opera stints and landed several guest-starring spots on the sitcoms The Nanny, Jesse and Suddenly Susan.

In 2001, he was cast as Walt Bannerman in USA Network's sci-fi drama The Dead Zone, the premiere of which was the highest-rated cable television series premiere at that time. In the series' fifth season, Bruno's directorial debut was the episode "Independence Day", which was dedicated in memory of his mother, who died of cancer.

Bruno remained a star on the show for the first five seasons; his character was killed off during the sixth-season premiere. Bruno made three additional guest appearances for the remainder of the final season. He also starred opposite Anthony Hopkins in the 2005 Roger Donaldson film The World's Fastest Indian, which according to Bruno was "one of the most exciting jobs" he's ever done.

In 2009, he appeared in 2 episodes of Prison Break and then appeared in the television movie Prison Break: The Final Break. He voiced Jack Slate in the 2002 video game Dead to Rights.  In 2014 Bruno started playing the recurring role of Adam Stevens on ABC Family's The Fosters. In 2014 he also did two episodes of MTV's Awkward playing the role of Danny, Matt's biological father. Chris is a professional MMA Fighter and was the oldest person in history to make his professional debut at 51 years old. Bruno is also a helicopter pilot.

Selected filmography

References

External links

 Chris Bruno's biography, USAnetwork.com; accessed August 29, 2015.

Living people
American male film actors
American male television actors
American male soap opera actors
Male actors from Connecticut
20th-century American male actors
21st-century American male actors
People from Milford, Connecticut
Year of birth missing (living people)